is a retired professional Japanese baseball player. He played for the Fukuoka SoftBank Hawks and the Yokohama DeNA BayStars. He is currently the hitting coach for the Ryukyu Blue Oceans.

External links

 NPB.com

1983 births
Living people
Baseball people from Miyazaki Prefecture
Japanese baseball players
Nippon Professional Baseball outfielders
Fukuoka Daiei Hawks players
Fukuoka SoftBank Hawks players
Yokohama BayStars players
Yokohama DeNA BayStars players